Death Drive is the first collaborative studio album by Sole & DJ Pain 1. It was released on June 9, 2014. It features guest appearances from Decomposure, Pedestrian, and Sean Bonnette. Sole described it as "a political rap album executed in a way that eschews the rapper persona of savior/prophet and speaks from the riot line."

Critical reception
Jessica Steinhoff of Alarm gave the album a favorable review, saying: "The duo examines the concept of heroism through beats and wordplay, taking aim at idols like Steve Jobs and Sigmund Freud in the process." On the week of June 6, 2014, Spin included it on the "10 Albums to Stream" list. Westword included it on the "31 Best Colorado Albums of 2014" list.

Track listing

References

External links
 
 

2014 albums
Collaborative albums
Sole (hip hop artist) albums